Herbert Harrison Hunter (December 25, 1895 – July 25, 1970) was a utility infielder–outfielder in Major League Baseball who played parts of four seasons between 1916 and 1921. He was born in Boston, Massachusetts.

Early career 
After making his debut for the New York Giants in 1916, Hunter was soon traded by the Giants, along with Larry Doyle and Merwin Jacobson, to the Chicago Cubs in exchange for Heinie Zimmerman and Mickey Doolan. He played two games with the Cubs in 1916 and another three in 1917. During World War I, Hunter served in the United States Navy, missing both the 1918 and 1919 seasons.

Post-World War I 
After the war, Hunter surfaced for another brief major league stint in 1920, this time for the Boston Red Sox. Later that year, Hunter organized a team of minor and major league players — dubbed the Hunter All-Americans — to go on a barnstorming tour of Japan, the first of three such trips he would put together.

In 1921, Hunter made his last big league appearance, a nine-game stint with the St. Louis Cardinals during which he served mostly as a pinch runner (though not a very successful one, as he was caught on all three of his stolen base attempts).

Minor leagues and more touring 

Hunter continued to play in the minor leagues through .

Post-baseball life 
Financial concerns caused Hunter to get out of the touring team business, turning things over to Lefty O'Doul for future endeavors. After again serving in the U.S. Navy in World War II, Hunter moved to Orlando, Florida, going into the real estate business. He died there in 1970 at the age of 74.

References

Sources

External links
 Retrosheet

1895 births
1970 deaths
Boston Red Sox players
Chicago Cubs players
New York Giants (NL) players
St. Louis Cardinals players
Major League Baseball infielders
Major League Baseball outfielders
Baseball players from Massachusetts
Brockton Shoemakers players
Vernon Tigers players
San Francisco Seals (baseball) players
Little Rock Travelers players